Events in the year 2023 in Somaliland.

Incumbents 

 President: Muse Bihi Abdi
 Vice President: Abdirahman Saylici
 Speaker of the House: Abdirisak Khalif
 Chairman of Elders: Suleiman Mohamoud Adan
 Chief Justice: Adan Haji Ali
 Minister of Foreign Affairs: Essa Kayd

Events 
Ongoing – Somali Civil War (2009–present); COVID-19 pandemic in Somaliland

January 

 2 January – Protests continue for a fifth day in Las Anod, Somaliland, with protesters demanding that the city be governed by Puntland instead of by Somaliland. Twenty people are killed in clashes between protestors and security forces.
 6 February – At least 34 people are killed after clashes occur in Laascaanood, Sool.

See also 

 COVID-19 pandemic in Africa
 Al-Shabaab (militant group)
 2023 in Somalia
 2023 in East Africa

External links 

 Additional information about Berbera Port

 Traders Await Trade Deal Between Somaliland, Ethiopia to Use Berbera Port
 Waiting for Ethiopia: Berbera port upgrade raises Somaliland's hopes for trade

References 

 
2020s in Somaliland
Years of the 21st century in Somaliland
Somaliland
Somaliland